Salvadora is a genus of colubrid snakes commonly called patchnose snakes or patch-nosed snakes, which are endemic to the western United States and Mexico. They are characterized by having a distinctive scale on the tip of the snout.

Species and subspecies
The following species and subspecies are recognized.

Salvadora bairdi  – Baird's patchnose snake
Salvadora deserticola  – Big Bend patchnose snake
Salvadora grahamiae  – mountain patchnose snake
Salvadora gymnorhachis 
Salvadora hexalepis  – western patchnose snake 
Salvadora hexalepis hexalepis  – desert patchnose snake
Salvadora hexalepis klauberi  – Baja California patchnose snake
Salvadora hexalepis mojavensis  – Mojave patchnose snake
Salvadora hexalepis virgultea  – coast patchnose snake
Salvadora intermedia  – Oaxacan patchnose snake
Salvadora lemniscata  – Pacific patchnose snake
Salvadora lineata  – Texas patchnose snake
Salvadora mexicana  – Mexican patchnose snake

References

Further reading
Baird SF, Girard CF (1853). Catalogue of North American Reptiles in the Museum of the Smithsonian Institution. Part I.—Serpents. Washington, District of Columbia: Smithsonian Institution. xvi + 172 pp. (Salvadora, new genus, p. 104).
Schmidt KP, Davis DD (1941). Field Book of Snakes of the United States and Canada. New York: G.P. Putnam's Sons. 365 pp. (Genus Salvadora, p. 135).
Smith HM, Brodie ED Jr (1982). Reptiles of North America: A Guide to Field Identification. New York: Golden Press. 240 pp. . (Genus Salvadora, p. 194).
Stebbins RC (2003). A Field Guide to Western Reptiles and Amphibians, Third Edition. The Peterson Field Guide Series ®. Boston and New York: Houghton Mifflin Company. xiii + 533 pp. . (Genus Salvadora, p. 356).
Wright AH, Wright AA (1957). Handbook of Snakes of the United States and Canada. Ithaca and London: Comstock. 1,105 pp. (in 2 volumes) (Genus Salvadora, p. 644).
Zim HS, Smith HM (1956). Reptiles and Amphibians: A Guide to Familiar Species: A Golden Nature Guide. New York: Simon and Schuster. 160 pp. (Genus Salvadora, pp. 88, 156).

External links

Colubrids
Snake genera
Taxa named by Spencer Fullerton Baird
Taxa named by Charles Frédéric Girard